Mary-Ann Ochota ( O-hot-ah; born 8 May 1981) is a British broadcaster and anthropologist specialising in anthropology, archaeology, social history and adventure factual television.

Biography
Ochota was born and grew up in Wincham, Northwich, Cheshire, to an Indian mother and a Polish father. She studied at the sixth-form college of Sir John Deane's College.

From 1999 to 2002 she studied Archaeology and Anthropology at Emmanuel College, Cambridge, specialising in Social Anthropology. She represented her college in the 2013 University Challenge Christmas Special, reaching the final, against Gonville and Caius College, Cambridge.

In 2008, she married children's author Joe Craig. Ochota gave birth to their son in July 2018.

Presenting
Ochota has reported for Channel 4's foreign affairs documentary strand, Unreported World. Her first film for the series, India's Slumkid Reporters was broadcast in September 2013, her second, Kickboxing Kids was broadcast in 2014 

In Britain's Secret Homes (ITV, 2013), she presented the stories of life at Creswell Crags, Derbyshire; St Mungo's Home for Working Girls, London; the Knap of Howar, Orkney, and the Broch of Mousa, Shetland.

Ochota presented the three-part series, Raised Wild for Animal Planet (broadcast as Feral Children in the UK), investigating cases of 'feral' children, defined as children either raised by or with animals, or children who had survived for a significant period in the wild.  There were three episodes in Season 1, in Uganda, Ukraine and Fiji.

Ochota was the co-presenter for Series 19 (2012) of Channel 4's archaeology show Time Team with Tony Robinson. She has contributed to current affairs radio programme Weekend World Today on the BBC World Service, BBC Radio 4 (Our Daily Bread) and is a regular reviewer on the Sky News paper preview.

In 2016, Ochota presented the series "Best of enemies" for German television, in which she travelled around Britain to find out what the British really think about the Germans. The series was aired on the German channel ARD-alpha in English with German subtitles.

Other work
Ochota featured as a model in several commercials including Kellogg's Special K.

She has been chairman and interviewer at the annual Institute of Art and Ideas Crunch arts festival and HowTheLightGetsIn Philosophy festival, blogs for The Independent and writes regularly for The Daily Telegraph on countryside issues and outdoor activities.

Her first book, published by Headline in 2013, in association with the British Museum and ITV accompanied the TV series of the same name, Britain's Secret Treasures.

Ochota joined the Clipper Round the World Yacht Race in 2012 on Leg 8, racing Edinburgh Inspiring Capital from Qingdao, China to San Francisco, USA. She sailed as a fully active crew member, and blogged for international adventure magazines whilst at sea.

She has written about her love of the outdoors and adventure activities, including wild camping, orienteering and UK scuba diving. Her second book, Hidden Histories: A Spotter's Guide to the British Landscape, was published in 2016.

She has raised funds for the RNLI, the mental health charity Mind, and Hope and Homes for Children.

Ochota is a co-presenter (with Clive Anderson) on the Smithsonian Channel series Mystic Britain.

References
Notes

Sources

External links
 Ochota's blogger profile at Independent Newspaper
 Knight Ayton, Ochota's page
 Britain's Secret Treasures book, written by Mary-Ann Ochota

English television presenters
British women television presenters
English anthropologists
British women anthropologists
Alumni of Emmanuel College, Cambridge
English female models
Living people
1981 births
People educated at Sir John Deane's College
People from Northwich
English people of Indian descent
English people of Polish descent
21st-century anthropologists
21st-century English women
21st-century English people